Seringia integrifolia is a shrub of the family Malvaceae native to inland Australia in New South Wales, South Australia, Western Australia, Queensland, and the Northern Territory.

(This statement in PlantNET does not seem to be supported by collections data, with Keraudrenia integrifolia occurrence data shown only in Queensland and New South Wales, and Seringia integrifolia shown occurring only in Westerna Australia. However, both APNI and Plants of the world online, accept the genus, Seringia, for this plant.

Taxonomy 
This plant was first described in 1845 by Ernst Steudel as Keraudrenia integrifolia, and transferred to the genus, Seringia, by Ferdinand von Mueller in 1860. In 2016 Keraudrenia was sunk into Seringia by Carolyn Wilkins and Barbara Whitlock.

References

integrifolia
Flora of New South Wales
Flora of Queensland
Rosids of Western Australia